The World Internet Conference (WIC), also known as the Wuzhen Summit, is an annual event, first held in 2014, organized by the Chinese government to discuss global Internet issues and policies. It is organized by the Cyberspace Administration of China.

Wuzhen Declaration
At the first World Internet Conference in 2014, an unknown party distributed a draft joint statement affirming the right of individual nations to develop, use, and govern the Internet, a concept Chinese Communist Party (CCP) general secretary and paramount leader Xi Jinping calls cyber sovereignty. Attendees received a draft of the statement overnight, slid under their hotel doors. As some objected to the statement, the organizers made no mention of it in the conference's final day.

Summits

2nd World Internet Conference
The second World Internet Conference in 2015 was attended by notable figures including co-founder of Alibaba Group Jack Ma, Chinese leader Xi Jinping, Russian Prime Minister Dmitry Medvedev and the prime ministers of Pakistan, Kazakhstan, and Kyrgyzstan. Xi promoted his concept of "Internet sovereignty", urging the world to "respect each country's Internet sovereignty, respect each country's right to choose their own development path and management model of the internet". Xi's speech was praised by Ma. The official Chinese media commented that Xi Jinping's speech showed China was bullish on Internet growth and China would build a "Digital Silk Road for Win-Win Cooperation-Information Infrastructure Partnership". The second World Internet Conference releases the Wuzhen Initiative, which calls on all countries to promote Internet development, foster cultural diversity in cyber space, share the fruits of Internet development, ensure peace and security in cyber space, and improve global Internet governance. However, the event was criticized by Amnesty International, which called on technology companies to boycott the conference. Amnesty International urged tech firms to reject China's position, calling it an attempt to promote censorship (on fake news).

In December 2015, Fadi Chehadé announced that, after he leaves his post as ICANN CEO in March 2016, he will become co-chair of a newly formed advisory committee to the World Internet Conference.  The first meeting of the committee will take place in mid 2016.

4th World Internet Conference
In December 2017, the 4th annual conference was held in China. Apple Inc.'s Tim Cook and Google's Sundar Pichai made their first appearances at Wuzhen Summit. A Qualcomm director gave a keynote speech about advances of 5g and AI. Bob Kahn, known as one of the fathers of the Internet, addresses the opening ceremony.

5th World Internet Conference
In November 2018, Xinhua's World first artificial intelligence (AI) anchor makes debut at the 5th annual conference that opens in China.

6th World Internet Conference
The 6th edition of the World Internet Conference was held on October 2021, 2019, with the theme of "Joining Hands in Constructing a Community of Shared Future in Cyberspace".

Responses

Lack of open access
The 2015 World Internet Conference organizers denied entry to reporters for certain U.S. media outlets, such as The New York Times. In response, Reporters Without Borders called for a boycott of the 2015 World Internet Conference.

See also
 Future of Go Summit

References

External links

 

Computer conferences
Internet censorship in China
Internet governance
Zhejiang
Annual events in China
Recurring events established in 2014
2014 establishments in China
Internet in China